Hasan Saifuddin Chandan is a Bangladeshi street photographer. He has been working with different concerns in Bangladesh since 1985. He is a member of the MAP Photo Agency. He has received more than 100 awards. He is also teaching photography in BUET Architect Department. He is the first FIAP Gold Medalist of Bangladesh.

Education
Chandan passed his matriculation from Government Laboratory High School & Collage, Dhaka, Bangladesh; intermediate from Notre Dame College, Dhaka.

Jobs
1987–1988: staff photographer, Bangladesh National Museum
1990–1991: staff photographer, Weekly Dialogue and Sanglap

Awards

Fédération Internationale de l'Art Photographique (FIAP) Gold Medal in Europa 85, Spain
Grand Prize in "Street And People", Asian Cultural Center For UNESCO, Japan, 1986
Honorable Mention in NIKON Photo Contest International, Japan, 1986
FIAP Honorable Mention in photojournalism competition, Australia, 1987
FIAP Honorable Mention in International Competition, Chittagong, 1989
3rd Prize in NINON Photo Contest International, Japan, 1991
FIAP Silver Medal in the International Photo Competition Celebrating 150th Anniversary of Photography in France, 1996

Exhibitions
1985: Group exhibition organized by the International Youth Year Festival Committee at Alliance Française de Dhaka
1985–1997: More than 60 photographs were exhibited in various international exhibitions worldwide, including ten photographs in an Author's Exhibition on the eve of the 150th Anniversary Authors' Exhibition of Photography in Pablo Picasso and Victor Hugo Museum in France

Publications

Publications by Chandan
The People at Kamalapur Railway Station. MAP, 1994. . Contains 63 photographs, published during an exhibition in Switzerland.
The People at Kamalapur Railway Station. Second edition, 2008. Contains 71 photographs.

Publications with contributions by Chandan
Britto: Images of Map. Dhaka: Matri, 2003. .

See also
GMB Akash
Munir Uz Zaman
Mohammad Rakibul Hasan
Rashid Talukder

References

External links

Living people
Bangladeshi photojournalists
Bangladeshi photographers
Bangladeshi artists
Bangladeshi male writers
Year of birth missing (living people)
Notre Dame College, Dhaka alumni